Sundari Neeyum Sundaran Naanum is a 1999 Tamil language comedy film directed by A. N. Rajagopal. The film stars Pandiarajan and Easwari Rao, with Ranjith, Manorama, Senthil, Charle, Anu Mohan, Pandu, Sathyapriya, Anuja, Anitha and Vaiyapuri playing supporting roles. It was released on 21 November 1999.

Plot

Subramani is an owner of a small video rental store and a wedding cameraman, and he lives with his widowed mother. Each time Subramani does something good, he ends up getting in trouble for it.

The henpecked Panneerselvam and the arrogant Mangamma have three daughters: Anuja, who is married to a jobless man; the childish Hamsaveni; and Krishnaveni. Mangamma only likes Krishnaveni and relies heavily on her. Panneerselvam asks Subramani to romance Krishnaveni. Subramani agrees and tries to seduce her. She then falls in love with him. When Mangamma learns of their love affair, she sends henchmen to beat him up, but Subramani easily beats all of them. Mangamma has no option but to lock Krishnaveni in her room, and she hires a private teacher for a daughter. Subramani's friend Perumal enters their home as a teacher, and he falls in love with Hamsaveni. Panneerselvam is Subramani's maternal uncle, and he explains to Subramani that he wants him to marry his daughter to reconcile with his sister: Subramani's mother.

In the past, after the death of Subramani's father, Panneerselvam brought his sister and his nephew Subramani at home. Mangamma wanted to throw them out of their home, so she tried to poison Subramani. Panneerselvam saved him, Subramani's mother and Subramani left the house on the post.

In the meantime, fraud Sivaramakrishnan is blackmailing Panneerselvam who had a secret affair with his sister. Sivaramakrishnan then enters in Panneerselvam's home as a rich man and he tries to impress Mangamma to marry her daughter Krishnaveni. But Subramani and Panneerselvam try many tricks to wreck Sivaramakrishnan's malicious plan. What transpires next forms the rest of the story.

Cast

Pandiarajan as Subramani
Easwari Rao as Krishnaveni
Ranjith as Sivaramakrishnan
Manorama as Subramani's mother
Senthil as Anuja's husband
Charle as Perumal
Anu Mohan as Panneerselvam
Pandu as Chinnasamy
Sathyapriya as Mangamma
Anuja as Anuja
Anitha as Hamsaveni
Vaiyapuri
Chaplin Balu
K. R. Vatsala as Mani Megalai
Mohanapriya
Idichapuli Selvaraj
Vellai Subbaiah as Astrologer
T. K. S. Natarajan
Suryakanth
MLA Thangaraj
Rathnakumar
Chelladurai as Police constable
Chitra Lakshmanan as Ramalingam (guest appearance)

Soundtrack

The film score and the soundtrack were composed by Deva. The soundtrack, released in 1999, features 5 tracks with lyrics written by Kamakodiyan, Kalaikumar and Ra. Ravishankar.

Reception

Balaji Balasubramaniam gave the film a rating of 1.5 stars out of 4, stating : "Sundari Neeyum Sundaran Naanum also falls victim to the trend with its duets and fights. But many of the jokes manage to be funny and this makes the overall viewing experience less painful that expected". Sify said that the film is a "waste of time".

References

1999 films
1990s Tamil-language films
Indian comedy films
Films scored by Deva (composer)
1999 comedy films